The 1923 Chicago Bears season was their fourth regular season completed in the National Football League. The team was able to improve on their 9–3  record from 1922 and finished with a 9–2–1 record under head coach/player George Halas earning them a second-place finish in the team standings earning, the third time in the last four years. As was normal for those days, the Bears played a few games on the road at the beginning of the season and then finished the season with a 9-game homestand. The Bears started very slow, losing 2 of their first 4 games and scoring only 6 points during those games (their two wins were both won 3–0). After losing 6–0 to eventual champion Canton Bulldogs in week 4, the Bears went undefeated after that. Just like in 1922, the Sternaman brothers starred, scoring 5 touchdowns, 6 field goals, and 8 PATs between the two of them. Johnny Bryan emerged as a scoring threat as well, running for 4 scores and passing for another. Most notably, in week 6's game against the Oorang Indians, George Halas set an NFL record with a 98-yard fumble return. Jack Tatum broke it with a 104-yard Fumble Return against the Green Bay Packers in 1972 and Aeneas Williams tied that feat with a 104-yard fumble return against the Redskins in 2000.

Future Hall of Fame players
George Halas, end
Ed Healey
George Trafton, center

Other leading players
Ed Sternaman, back
Joe Sternaman, quarterback
Laurie Walquist, quarterback
Hunk Anderson, guard
Johnny Bryan, back

Schedule

Game in italics was an exhibition game.

Standings

References
1923 Chicago Bears season

Chicago Bears
Chicago Bears seasons
Chicago Bears